Phyllonorycter pterocaryae is a moth of the family Gracillariidae. It is known from the island of Hokkaidō in Japan and from the Russian Far East.

The wingspan is 5–6 mm.

The larvae feed on Juglans ailanthifolia, Juglans mandschurica, Juglans regia and Pterocarya rhoifolia. They mine the leaves of their host plant. The mine has the form of a ptychonomous leaf mine, situated between two veins of the upper surface of the leaf.

References

pterocaryae
Moths of Japan
Moths of Asia
Moths described in 1963